St. Mary's, Inverness is a Roman Catholic church in the city of Inverness, Inverness-shire, in Scotland and is a part of the Diocese of Aberdeen. The building is significant for the high quality of its altar and stained glass windows. There is daily mass in the church and it also the home of the Polish Chaplaincy for Inverness.

History

The church was opened on 2 April 1837. Earlier Catholics had worshipped on Margaret Street, with the Mission separated from Eskdale in 1827, and it was known to the town "as a place where Lord Lovat and the tinkers worshipped". There were said to be about 400 Catholics in Inverness in 1846.

The presbytery was built at a cost of £1,200 in 1888 due to the benevolence of Miss Jessie McDonell. On 22 August 1894 a solemn re-opening of the church took place as the sanctuary had been remodelled to accommodate 250 extra worshippers and an altar designed by Peter Paul Pugin built by Carruthers of Inverness as well as Stations of the Cross. The sanctuary was remodelled with a new altar and tiles in order to conform with changes in liturgy heralded by the Second Vatican Council in 2014.

A school was built in 1845 staffed by Franciscan nuns at first, but the building was replaced in 1943.

Interior

References

External links

 

Saint Mary
Category A listed buildings in Highland (council area)
Gothic Revival church buildings in Scotland
19th-century Roman Catholic church buildings in the United Kingdom
Roman Catholic churches completed in 1837